Xylophilus may refer to:
 Xylophilus (bacterium), a bacteria genus in the family Xanthomonadaceae
 Xylophilus (beetle), a beetles genus in the family Eucnemidae